Muhammet Sinan Keskin (born 13 August 1994) is a Dutch-Turkish professional footballer who plays as a midfielder.

Club career

Early career
Born in The Hague, Netherlands, Keskin began his career in the youth ranks of local side Lenig en Snel. He then transferred to local Haaglandia before being recruited to join the Ajax Youth Academy.

Ajax
In his first season with Ajax, Keskin played for the Ajax A1 youth squad, helping the team to the finals of the NextGen Series, the Champions League equivalent for under-20 youth squads at age 18. Ajax lost the final to Inter Milan 5–3 on penalties after extra time, following a 1–1 draw in regulation time, and finished the tournament as runners-up. Keskin remained in the A1 (under-19) team the following season before he was promoted to the reserves team Jong Ajax a year later. On 27 January 2014, he made his professional debut for Jong Ajax in a 2–1 win over FC Oss in the Eerste Divisie.

FC Utrecht
On 19 May 2015, it was announced that Keskin had transferred to FC Utrecht.

International career
Keskin holds both Turkish and Dutch citizenship and is still eligible to represent either team internationally. He was first called up to the Turkey national under-18 team for a friendly match. Keskin then appeared for the Netherlands national under-19 team in a 2–1 friendly match win over Scotland on 10 September 2012. He has since pledged his allegiance to Turkey and made two appearances for the under-19 team.

Career statistics

Honours

Club
Ajax A1 (under-19)
 Nike Eredivisie: 2011–12
 NextGen Series Runner-up: 2011–12

References

External links
 
 
 Netherlands U19 stats at OnsOranje
 

1994 births
Living people
Footballers from The Hague
Turkish footballers
Turkey youth international footballers
Dutch people of Turkish descent
Dutch footballers
Netherlands youth international footballers
Association football midfielders
Haaglandia players
AFC Ajax players
FC Utrecht players
Eredivisie players
Eerste Divisie players